Emmanuelle Swiercz (born 1 December 1978) is a French classical pianist.

Biography 
After her piano prize at the Conservatoire de Paris, Swiercz entered the advanced cycle in the classes of Michel Béroff,  and Marie-Françoise Bucquet. She also benefited from the advice of Jorge Chaminé, György Sebők, György Kurtág, Dmitri Bashkirov, Leon Fleisher and Murray Perahia.

She has performed at numerous festivals: Festival de La Roque-d'Anthéron, Festival Chopin de Bagatelle, "Les Nouveaux Solistes" at the Jardin des Serres d'Auteuil, ... She also gives concerts abroad, notably at the Concertgebouw of Amsterdam, the International Piano Forum in Berlin, the Rudolfinum in Prague, the Athenaeum in Bucharest, the Théâtre Les Salons in Geneva and the Théâtre national des Beaux-Arts in Rio de Janeiro.

Training 
Swiercz, who only started playing the piano at the age of 9, was passionate and determined and gave her first concert only two years later.

From the age of 16, she was unanimously admitted by the jury second nominated to the Conservatoire de Paris.

Invited by several venues in France (Salle Pleyel, Salle Gaveau, Cité de la Musique, auditoriums of the Musée d’Orsay, the Invalides and Senate in Paris, the Arsenal de Metz); she also performs throughout Europe.

Partners 
As soloist, Emmanuelle Swiercz plays with the orchestras of Nagoya (Japan), Kazan and Novossibirsk (Russia), Viareggio (Italy), Kharkov (Ukraine), as well as with the Orchestra of the Conservatoire de Paris and the Orchestre de Douai-Région Nord-Pas de Calais.

She participates in the promotion of French Romantic music with the support of the Bru-Zane Foundation.

Selected discography 
 2007: Sergueï Rachmaninov - works for piano - Intrada
 2008: Robert Schumann - works for piano - Intrada
 2011: Franz Liszt - œuvres pour piano - Intrada
 2013: Théodore Gouvy - Ediciones Singulares.
 2015: Frédéric Chopin - Intégrale des Nocturnes - La Musica.

References

External links 
 Personal website
 Chopin, Nocturnes Emmanuelle Swiercz on La Musica
 Biography and interview on Pianobleu.com
 Emmanuelle Swiercz on France Musique
 Emmanuelle Swiercz, entre virtuosité et simplicité on ResMusica
 Emmanuelle Swiercz on Discogs
 Nocturne n°13 by Frédéric Chopin by Emmanuelle Swiercz (YouTube)

21st-century French women classical pianists
1978 births
Living people
Place of birth missing (living people)
Conservatoire de Paris alumni